Rally Estonia is a rallying event organised each year in Estonia. It is the largest and most high-profile motorsport event in the country and runs on smooth gravel roads in the south of the country, some of which are purpose-built for the rally. The city of Tartu hosts the ceremonial start and finish, with the rally headquarters and service park usually based in the Tehvandi Sports Center in Otepää. From 2014 to 2016, Rally Estonia was a round of the FIA European Rally Championship. Rally Estonia was the official WRC Promotional Rally in 2019 and joined the World Rally Championship calendar in 2020.

History

2010–2013: Early years
The inaugural event, known as Mad-Croc Rally Estonia for sponsorship reasons, was held in 2010 as a part of the Estonian Rally Championship. It was won by Markko Märtin who won all the special stages. In the following year, the rally became known as the auto24 Rally Estonia. Mads Østberg took back-to-back wins in 2011 and 2012 driving a Ford Fiesta RS WRC thus becoming the first two-time winner of Rally Estonia. Local driver Georg Gross won the rally in 2013.

2014–2016: ERC event
In 2014 Rally Estonia became a round of the European Rally Championship. Ott Tänak won the rally driving a Ford Fiesta R5. The 2014 edition was awarded with the ERC Rally of the Year Award. In 2015 Aleksey Lukyanuk made history as he took the overall win driving a R4 spec (ERC-2 category) Mitsubishi Lancer Evo X against more powerful R5 spec Ford Fiesta driven by Kajetan Kajetanowicz. In 2016 Lukyanuk was on the verge of defending his win, but crashed out from the lead on the penultimate stage, allowing Ralfs Sirmacis to take victory in his Škoda Fabia R5.

2018–2019: WRC aspirations
The event was put on hiatus in 2017 and returned in 2018, when it became known as Shell Helix Rally Estonia for sponsorship reasons. The rally became a popular event with World Rally Championship works teams preparing for Rally Finland. The 2018 edition marked the first time the new Toyota Yaris WRC entered a competition outside the WRC series. Ott Tänak won eleven stages out of sixteen and took his second Rally Estonia win. In 2019 the rally organisers signed an agreement with WRC Promoter and Rally Estonia became the first ever official WRC Promotional Event, and revealed ambitions to become part of the World Rally Championship from 2022. Every WRC manufacturer team entered the event, making Rally Estonia the largest rally outside the World Rally Championship. Ott Tänak took his third Rally Estonia win in dominant style winning all but two special stages. The 2019 rally attracted more than 52,000 fans, a 25 per cent rise on 2018. More than 100 countries screened the event on television and it also proved a big hit on social media, with 25.8 million impressions and 2.7 million video views on WRC and event channels.

2020–present: WRC event

2020
The 2020 edition of the non-championship rally and the second as a WRC Promotional Rally was scheduled to slot into the 2020 WRC calendar a week after Kenya’s Safari Rally, round eight of the series, and two weeks ahead of the following fixture at Rally Finland. However, it was announced in February that the 2020 edition has been cancelled after the event organizers were unable to find agreement with the national governing body, the Estonian Autosport Union (EAU). Principal issue in the dispute was the competition registration fee, which the EASU raised 5,000 percent from €2,000 to €100,000 in January, just six months before the scheduled start of the rally in July. Paying that level of a fee was not possible, both legally and budget-wise, as stated by the organizers.

In March the spreading COVID-19 pandemic led to cancellation of six World Rally Championship rounds. Organizers of the championship announced that they were considering adding events to the schedule that had not been part of the original calendar. Estonia was among the countries who had expressed interest in hosting the event. On July 2, 2020, WRC Promoter announced that the season would return with an updated calendar with newcomers Rally Estonia hosting the resuming round between 4 and 6 September making Estonia the thirty-third nation to stage a championship round in the WRC.

Winning the warm-up event, local favourites Tänak and Järveoja were determined to vanquish their home soil for the third straight year. The reigning world champions showed an impressive speed throughout the weekend, leading almost the entire rally to win their first victory for Hyundai in their motherland. Teammates Craig Breen and Paul Nagle finished second after a consistent performance to complete a Hyundai 1–2. The event was widely praised and considered by some of the FIA members as one of the best WRC events of all-time. The 2020 edition was awarded with the WRC Team Spirit Award by successfully executing a Covid-safe maiden WRC event in just 63 days.

2021
After last years' success, Rally Estonia was included in the 2021 WRC calendar as round seven of the twelve-round championship. Ahead of home crowds, local favourites Tänak and Järveoja were keen to repeat their success one year ago. It wasn't long until they led the rally, but double puncture happened in two consecutive stages on Friday's morning loop put them from heroes to zeroes — They run out of spare wheel to change, meaning they could not go any further on Friday. Following Tänak and Järveoja's issue, Kalle Rovanperä and Jonne Halttunen put them in advantage for the victory contention. Having fended off the pursuit of Craig Breen and Paul Nagle, they increasingly extend their lead to the eventual shy off one minute to claim their maiden WRC win. At 20 years and 290 days, Rovanperä became the youngest driver to win a WRC event, breaking the previous record of 22 years and 313 days held by Jari-Matti Latvala. Breen and Nagle achieved their first podium of the season by finishing second, with teammates Thierry Neuville and Martijn Wydaeghe rounded out of the podium with their fifth third place of the season.

2022
The 2022 edition was scheduled as round seven of the thirteen-round championship. Rally Estonia marked the first high-speed gravel rally for the WRC’s hybrid-powered Rally1 cars and turned out to be quite a spectacle. Twelve months ago Kalle Rovanperä became the WRC’s youngest rally winner with victory in Estonia. This time the 21-year-old Finn finished the four-day gravel road fixture 1min 00.9sec clear of Toyota team-mate Elfyn Evans. Evans dominated initially but Rovanperä grabbed the lead in Friday’s final rain-soaked speed test. After fine-tuning his car’s set-up on Saturday morning, he reeled off seven consecutive fastest times to distance the Welshman and more than double his advantage. Rain again ensured slippery conditions in Sunday’s closing leg but Rovanperä was in no mood to compromise. He won the final Power Stage by an astounding 22.4sec to gain maximum bonus points. Such was his dominance that he won 14 of the rally’s 24 tests. Rovanperä and co-driver Jonne Halttunen continued their unstoppable form, when the Finnish crew claimed their fifth win in six rallies of the 2022 season. Home hero Ott Tänak completed the podium a further 54.8sec adrift in a Hyundai i20, with only a single stage win. He never looked like threatening those ahead as he wrestled handling problems but the four-time Estonia winner was more than good enough to finish best of the rest.

2023
Rally Estonia is part of the WRC calendar for the fourth consecutive year as the 2023 edition is scheduled as round eight of the thirteen-round championship.

Winners

Multiple winners

 Years in bold mark WRC event
 Years in italic mark ERC event

Detailed results

Accolades
 2014 ERC Rally of the Year
 2014 Tartu Sports Event of the Year
 2020 Tartu Deed of the Year
 2020 WRC Asahi Kasei Team Spirit Award

References

External links

 
 Rally Estonia at eWRC-results

 
Estonia
Estonia
Recurring sporting events established in 2010